Xupu County is a county of Hunan Province, China, it is under the administration of Huaihua Prefecturel-level City.

Located on the west central Hunan, the county is bordered to the north by Yuanling County, to the northeast by Anhua County, to the east by Xinhua and Longhui Counties, to the south by Dongkou County, to the west by Hongjiang City, Zhongfang and Chenxi Counties. Xupu County has 18 towns under its jurisdiction, the government seat is the town of Lufeng.

The Xu River flows through the built-up area where it is joined by the Sandu River. Some kilometers downstream it joins the Yuan River.

Yao people
According to the Xupu County Gazetteer (1993:641), the following three subgroups of Yao live in over 41 villages and number about 2,600 people.

Flowery Yao 花瑶
Flowery-Trouser Yao 花裤瑶
Seven-Surname Yao 七姓瑶

Climate

References
www.xzqh.org

External links 

County-level divisions of Hunan
Huaihua